Bigg Boss 4 was the fourth season of the Indian reality TV series Bigg Boss. Kamal Haasan returned as host of the show for the fourth time. The show was launched on 4 October 2020 on Star Vijay and also available on Disney+ Hotstar.

The season's finale took place on 17 January 2021 with Aari Arujunan winning the Bigg Boss title with the most number of votes in bigg boss history., whereas Balaji Murugadoss emerged as the first runner-up.

Anitha Sampath, Balaji Murugadoss, Ramya Pandian and Suresh Chakravarthi returned as contestants in Bigg Boss Ultimate (season 1).

Production

Eye Logo
This season, the logo is a colorful eye with a pupil that resembles a compass, filled  with multiple colours. Every season, the logo of the show is changed based on a particular theme. This theme has also been incorporated in the interiors of the house.

House
As with the past three seasons, the house is located at EVP FILM CITY in Chennai, Tamil Nadu.

The house has been completely renovated from Season 3. Rather than warm colours from the last season, this time, the house has been fully designed in vibrant shades with gaudy lights.
 
Rooms/Areas in the house include the confession room, living room, kitchen, dining room, store room, two attached bedrooms (along with an attached toilet in one of the rooms), bathroom, garden with some lounging areas, swimming pool (not in use this season), gym (removed), activity room and resting room (Bigg Boss Prison).

This season, however, remains as the only season in the Bigg Boss Tamil franchise to have not utilized the 'Secret Room' function, something which has been used in the past three seasons.

Airing
It was broadcast on the channel throughout the week at 09:30 PM from 4 October 2020 to 3 January 2021 and, it was broadcast on the channel throughout the weekdays at 10:00 PM and 09:30 PM at the weekends from 4 January 2021 to 17 January 2021.

Audience and guests 
There was no in person audience due to the COVID-19 pandemic however they were connected via Zoom to see the Grand Launch and the Weekend episodes. Similarly, there were no guests allowed in Bigg Boss due to the COVID–19 situation. During the thirteenth week however, the parents of the contestants were allowed to come in-person to the house and meet their family members who were participating in the show after two Weeks of quarantine.

Bigg Boss 4 voting 
As Bigg Boss 4 online voting has begun, viewers can vote for their favorite contestant through Hotstar, or by giving a missed call. Voting is only open on Weekdays on Hotstar.

Housemate Status

|Day 77
|
|-
|Nisha
|Day 1
|Day 70
|
|-
|Ramesh
|Day 1
|Day 69
|
|-
|Sanam
|Day 1
|Day 63
|
|-
|Samyuktha
|Day 1
|Day 56
|
|-
|Suchitra
|Day 28
|Day 49
|
|-
|Suresh
|Day 1
|Day 35
|
|-
|Velmurugan
|Day 1
|Day 28
|
|-
|Rekha
|Day 1
|Day 14
|
|}

Housemates
The participants in the order of appearance and entry in house are:

Original entrants
 Rio Raj, a former television host on Star Vijay, also known for his acting roles in Saravanan Meenatchi (2016–2018) and Nenjamundu Nermaiyundu Odu Raja (2019).
 Sanam Shetty, an actress and model, known for winning the beauty pageant Miss South India 2016.
 Rekha Josephine Harris, an actress, known for acting in films such as Kadalora Kavithaigal (1986) and Punnagai Mannan (1986).
 Balaji Murugadoss, a fitness model and entrepreneur, known for winning the beauty pageant Mister India International 2019.
 Anitha Sampath, a newsreader and television anchor best known for her stint on Sun News.
 Shivani Narayanan, an actress, known for acting roles in television series such as Pagal Nilavu (2016–2019) and Rettai Roja (2019–2020).
 Jithan Ramesh, the brother of Jiiva, an actor, appeared in the films Jithan (2005) and Osthe (2011).
 Velmurugan, a playback singer, known for singing many popular Tamil folk songs.
 Aari Arujunan, an actor, known for acting in the films Nedunchaalai (2014) and Maya (2015).
 Somshekar, a model and mixed martial artist, known for appearing in some frames of films such as Velaiilla Pattadhari 2 (2017), and Soorarai Pottru (2020).
 Gabriella Charlton, a dancer and former child artist, known for acting in films such as 3 (2012) and Appa (2016).
 Aranthangi Nisha, a stand-up comedian known for participating in the show Kalakka Povathu Yaaru 5(Runner-up), and acting in films such as Maari 2 (2018) and Kalakalappu 2 (2018).
 Ramya Pandian, an actress, known for acting in films such as Aan Devathai (2018), and Joker (2016).
 Samyuktha Shanmuganathan, a model known for winning the beauty pageant Miss Chennai 2007, acting in the television series Chandrakumari (2018), and in films such as Oolu, Dhanusu Raasi Neyargale (2019), and Tughlaq Darbar (2021).
 Suresh Chakravarthi, an actor, former television host, and entrepreneur, known for Chinna Papa Periya Papa and also directing the reality show Pepsi Ungal Choice.
 Aajeedh Khalique, a playback singer, known for winning the reality show Super Singer Junior 3.

Wildcard entrants
 Archana Chandhoke, a senior television host, known for hosting shows such as Namma veetu kalyanam,Super Mom and Sa Re Ga Ma Pa Lil Champs.
 Suchitra Ramadurai, a playback singer, radio jockey and dubbing artist, who has sung many Tamil songs.

Special episodes

Prison
Each week, two housemates who did not perform well in the Luxury Budget Task, are sent to the Bigg Boss Prison. The cell does not include the luxury facilities which are in the house. It contains a metal cot, another bed on the floor.

 Female housemates
 Male housemates

Hamam caller of the week
Since Week 9, Bigg Boss is letting its sponsor Hamam choose a caller from the audience, who then chooses and virtually questions a contestant regarding the game. The selected housemate can't refuse to answer the caller, each week the caller will change and be randomly selected from the public.

Celebrations

Navratri
On Day 22, the housemates in the Bigg Boss House celebrated the festival Navratri (Vijayadasami), in which the contestants cooked a feast, played village games, danced to songs, and decorated the Bigg Boss House. The episode was also extended to four hours, from the usual one hour. Starting at 6:30 pm rather than the usual 9:30 pm. The events are presented by Anitha.

Each housemate is given a plain golu doll to be painted and used for Navratri celebrations. At afternoon, the housemates are divided into two teams one is City team and the other is Village team and are given ingredients for the cooking competition. So as each team cooks a dish for the celebration. The cooking competition was judged by Anitha.

The cooking competition was won by City team. Then there were frames placed in the living room and garden area each one for City team and village team respectively, so that each person can stand back of the frame and express their wishes to their family members. It was continued by seven stones with the same team. The winner of seven stones is again City team. Then the male contestants are asked to praise the women contestants of the house. It is followed by the pooja of Navaratri. Then the contestants were asked express their talents on the stage placed in the garden area. At midnight, everyone sits around the Bonfire and plays Dumb Charades. In this game a player in a team is given a chit with a song name and are asked to act related to the terms in the chit so that their teammates find the song in the chit. The Village team won the Dumb Charades.

Kamal Haasan birthday
On Day 34, Kamal Haasan celebrated his birthday with housemates. On this day Bigg Boss Tamil and Bigg Boss Telugu had a virtual crossover where the Telugu and Tamil housemates and the hosts Kamal Haasan and Nagarjuna meet each other.

Diwali

The housemates in Bigg Boss Tamil had a pre–Diwali Celebration, in which all the housemates participated in activities and games.

 Events on Day 36
 The nomination process was cancelled due to the celebration of Diwali throughout Week 6 in the Bigg Boss House. On Day 36, the housemates were split into two groups, Kambi Mathappu and Busvaanam, and played a game called Ippove Kanna Kattudhe, in which the housemates had to put their forehead on a metal pole and go around the pole for ten rounds, after which they have to run and touch the wall, before arriving at the starting place. The Busvaanam team won the round. The housemates were then told to write a letter about someone they loved, and had to share the letter with the other housemates on a platform located in the Garden Area.
 Events on Day 38
 All the housemates need to get in a pair, one of the housemates in the pair has to stand on a rock while the other housemate drags them across to the finish line as soon as possible where their time will be recorded. The pair with the fastest time will win the task. Balaji and Shivani were selected as the winners of the task
 Events on Day 39
 The housemates gathered in the activity room, where the former Bigg Boss 2 and Bigg Boss 3 housemates had a virtual meet with the current Bigg Boss housemates. The former housemates conducted activities in which the current housemates participated. After the participation of all the housemates, Samyuktha, Balaji, Ramya, Archana, Aari, Anitha, and Aajeedh were selected as the winners of the task and received prizes.
 Events on Day 40
 The housemates were given a day off from their respective house duties due to Diwali. The housemates were involved in many activities, including a dinner feast, a dance celebration, prize giveaways, amongst other tasks.

Christmas
The housemates in Bigg Boss Tamil had a Christmas Celebration, in which all the housemates participated in activities and games.
 Events on Day 81
 A Christmas choir group came to perform Christmas songs to the housemates on Christmas Eve.
 Events on Day 82
 A new bunch of Christmas choir group came to perform. All the housemates receive presents on Christmas day.

Freeze task
On Week 13, family members of the housemates entered the BB house as part of luxury budget task (Freeze Task).
 
Day 86
Shivani's mother Akila Narayanan entered the BB house as part of Freeze Task.
Balaji's brother Ramesh entered the BB house as part of Freeze Task

Day 87
Ramya's mother, Shanthi Duraipandian, and her brother, Parasu Pandian, entered the BB house as part of Freeze task.
Rio's wife Shruthi Rio entered the BB house as part of Freeze task. Rio's mother, mother-in-law and other family members along with friends were been shown in the video clip.
Somshekar's brother Lathesh entered the BB house as part of Freeze Task. Som's mother and family members were shown in video clip along with his pet dog.

Day 88
Gabriella's mother Sunitha entered the BB house as part of Freeze Task.
Aajeedh's mother Shabana Begum and his sister Shama entered the BB house as part of Freeze Task.
Aari's wife Nadhiya and his daughter Riya entered the BB house as part of Freeze Task.

Pongal
On Day 102 the housemates in Bigg Boss Tamil had a Pongal Celebration, in which all the housemates participated in activities and games.
 Events on Day 102
 The housemates will be divided into two teams to play the special games. There were games like Uriyadi and Slow Cycle Race which all the housemates participated in...oops.

Bigg Boss finale

On Day 105, all the 13 evicted and walked housemates (Rekha, Velmurugan, Suresh, Suchitra, Samyuktha, Sanam, Ramesh, Nisha, Archana, Anitha, Aajeedh, Shivani, and Gabriella) were invited to the Bigg Boss Finale. Some of the housemates performed dance and singing performances on the show. At the end of the show, Aari Arjunan was then declared the Winner of Bigg Boss 4, followed by Balaji Murugadoss, Rio Raj, Ramya Pandian, and Somshekar.

Weekly summary

The main events in the house are summarized in the table below. A typical week begins with nominations, followed by the luxury budget task, captaincy task, and then the eviction of a housemate during the Saturday and Sunday episodes. Tasks, evictions, and other events for a particular week are noted in order of sequence. After every event in each week, the days will be noted, too. For the detailed summary, please expand below

Nomination table

Notes 
 indicates that the housemate was directly nominated for eviction.
 indicates the House Captain.
 indicates the nominees for the House Captaincy.
 indicates the former House Captain. (Former meaning that the House Captain would have been stripped of the captaincy, or else evicted/ejected/walked out after being nominated as the Captain)
 indicates that the housemate was saved from nominations (Immune)
 indicates that an evicted contestant was sent to Secret room and re-entered the Bigg Boss House after few days.
 indicates that contestant left the Bigg Boss house on his own.
  indicates the contestant has been ejected.
  indicates the Eviction free pass has been used on a housemate.
  indicates the winner.
  indicates the first runner-up.
  indicates the second runner-up.
  indicates the third runner-up.
  indicates the fourth runner-up.
  indicates the contestant has been evicted.
  indicates a new wildcard contestant.
  indicates the contestant is nominated.

 
 
 : During a task that was conducted in Week 1. Team 1: Aajeedh, Anitha, Balaji, Ramesh, Ramya, Shivani, Somshekar and Suresh, whilst Team 2: Aari, Gabriella, Nisha, Rio, Samyuktha, Sanam, Velmurugan and Rekha. Each team had to shortlist four housemates from each team for the Week 2 eviction process.
 : During this task, Aari, Anitha, Balaji, Nisha, Ramesh, Rio, Som, and Velmurugan were granted immunity for the following week's nomination process, whilst, Aajeedh, Gabriella, Ramya, Samyuktha, Sanam, Shivani, and Suresh were shortlisted for the following week's nomination process.
: Aajeedh, Ramya, Gabriella, Samyuktha, Shivani, Sanam, Suresh and Rekha were nominated in Week 2 eviction, however Bigg Boss gave one of the nominated housemates to win the eviction free pass which allows the housemate to save themselves if they ever got evicted. However Aajeedh won the task and received the Eviction Free Pass. 
: Suresh was initially shortlisted for the Week 2 eviction process. However, he received immunity from the eviction after he became the House Captain in Week 2.
: During a task conducted in Week 2, Sanam and Velmurugan were granted immunity for the following week's nomination process.
: Archana entered the Bigg Boss House as a wildcard contestant and was exempted from the Week 3 nomination process.
: Aajeedh was to be evicted on Week 3. However, he used his Eviction Free-Pass to save himself from eviction, without bestowing it on another nominated housemate. As a result, the eviction process was cancelled.
: Ramya, who was in first place for the 1 to 16 arrangement task, had the power to swap any of the captaincy housemates with another housemate. As a result, Ramya swapped Nisha with Samyuktha as she felt that Samyuktha was responsible and sorted out problems without partiality.
: Suchitra entered the Bigg Boss House as a wildcard contestant and was exempted from the Week 5 nomination process.
: The nomination and eviction process for Week 6 was scrapped due to the celebration of Diwali.
: Anitha has won Nominate Topple Task and escaped from the Week 8 nomination process by directly nominating Samyuktha.
: During the Luxury Budget Task conducted in Week 8, Aari, Anitha, Archana, Balaji, Nisha, Ramya, Shivani and Sanam, who failed their tasks, were directly nominated for the Week 9 eviction process. However, as the housemates were evacuated from the Bigg Bose House due to the Nivar Cyclone, the Luxury Budget Task was temporarily paused, and the direct nomination was shifted to Week 10.
: The Top 3 Contestants in the Luxury Budget #1 – #13 Place Arrangement Task: Aari, Balaji, and Archana, were given power to swap a housemate who is safe with them, such that they get nominated. Aari swapped himself with Ramesh, Balaji swapped himself with Gabriella, and Archana swapped herself with Som.
: In Week 10, Bigg Boss announced double eviction. Ramesh was evicted on Saturday's episode and Nisha was evicted on Sunday's episode.
: In Week 11, Bigg Boss announced that the nomination process won't be the regular nomination where the housemates announce their nominations in the confession room privately but rather having an open nomination where housemates need to select two housemates and nominate them in front of the other housemates.
: In Week 11, Archana won captaincy and become the captain of Week 12. However Archana got evicted on Day 77 and was directly removed from Captaincy. However, she was given the option to select a captain between Balaji and Ramya, and she selected Balaji as the Week 12 House Captain.
: Rio became the House Captain for the third time on Week 14, but housemates could still nominate him for the final eviction process.
: In Week 14, Somshekar won ticket to finale and became the first finalist of the season.
: In the end of Week 14, the remaining five housemates would be selected as finalists, and would be eligible to compete to win the show.
: In Week 15 Aari, Balaji, Gabriella, Ramya, Rio and Somshekar competed for a spot in the final five.
: In Week 15 Gabriella took 5 Lakh and left the Bigg Boss house on Day 102.
: In Week 15 Aari, Balaji, Ramya, Rio and Somshekar officially became the final five finalists eligible to win.
: On day 105, Somshekar became the 4th Runner-Up.
: On day 105, Ramya became the 3rd Runner-Up.
: On day 105, Rio became the 2nd Runner-Up.
: On day 105, Balaji became the 1st Runner-Up.
: On day 105, Aari became the Winner and was awarded ₹50 lakh and a trophy.

References

External links 

Tamil 4
2020 Indian television seasons
2020 Tamil-language television seasons
Kamal Haasan
Star Vijay original programming
Tamil-language television shows